Lisa Marie Bluder (born April 16, 1961) is the head coach for the Iowa Hawkeyes women's basketball program. She is an alumna of the University of Northern Iowa, 1983 and Linn-Mar High School, 1979.

Coaching career

St. Ambrose University
She began her coaching career at St. Ambrose University, where she coached six successful seasons building the Bees into an NAIA powerhouse. During her tenure at St. Ambrose, she recorded a 169–36 (.824) mark and guided the Bees to four straight national tournaments, including two consecutive Final Four appearances. The 1990 St. Ambrose team was ranked No. 1 and she was named the NAIA Converse Coach of the Year.

Drake University
Bluder compiled a 187–106 (.638) record at Drake in 10 seasons and a 169–36 (.824) record in six seasons at NAIA St. Ambrose University. She currently sits 39th in career winning percentage (.692) for Division I active coaches.

She is also committed to her team's academic success. She coached two Academic All-America Players of the Year in current Hawkeye Associate Head Coach Jan Jensen (1991) and Tricia Wakely (1996). As a team, the Bulldogs ranked fourth in 1995 graduation rate success among teams ranked in the USA Today/CNN final top-25 Coaches' Poll. In 2004 and 2012, a team record eight student athletes were named to the academic all-Big Ten team. Student athletes who have played under her have a 100 percent job placement following their career, and all of her recruited athletes have earned their degree.

University of Iowa
Bluder, alongside her husband David and daughter Hannah, was introduced as the Hawkeyes' fifth head coach in front of a packed press room in Carver-Hawkeye Arena on April 7, 2000. The native of Marion, IA, came to Iowa after spending 10 successful seasons at Drake University.

Bluder, the all-time winningest coach in program history, is in her 24th year as head women's basketball coach at the University of Iowa and her 40th year overall. Under her direction, the Hawkeyes have advanced to 16 postseason appearances (12 NCAA and four WNIT) in 17 seasons, including NCAA Tournament berths in eight of the last 10 seasons. Iowa has advanced to the postseason in 10 consecutive seasons (eight NCAA and two WNIT). Bluder is the dean of Big Ten coaches and has posted a 396–217 (.629) record at Iowa and her 35-year record stands at 752–359 (.679). Her 396 wins at Iowa are the most of any Hawkeye women's basketball coach, passing Hall of Famer C. Vivian Stringer (269 wins).

Bluder is a three-time Big Ten Coach of the Year (2001, 2008 and 2010) and two-time WBCA Regional Coach of the Year (2001 and 2008). She has guided Iowa to a winning record in 14 of her 15 years at Iowa, including 11 upper-division finishes in the challenging Big Ten Conference. Bluder has led Iowa to nine 20-win seasons in her 15 years, including the last three years in a row.

Bluder had one of her most successful seasons in 2010–11, leading Iowa to a 22–9 overall record and a third-place finish in the Big Ten at 10–6. Iowa's overall win–loss record in 2010–11 was the best for an Iowa team since the 1995–96 campaign. The Hawkeyes were nationally ranked for 14 weeks during the season, reaching No. 14 in the Associated Press Poll and No. 13 in the ESPN/USA Today Coaches Poll. Iowa received an at-large berth into the NCAA Tournament for the fourth-straight season.

Another one of Bluder's best seasons was the 2018-19 season with her star player Megan Gustafson who would later go onto the WNBA with the Dallas Wings. They finished with a 29-7 record; with a Big Ten tournament Championship and a trip to the Elite Eight in the 2019 NCAA Tournament. They finished No. 8 in the Postseason AP Top 25. They got the automatic bid to the tournament as well with the Big Ten Championship. It was their best record ever.

On April 6, 2019, Bluder was named the Naismith College Coach of the Year.

Career milestones
She has reached five coaching milestones while coaching Iowa. During her first season, she collected her 200th victory at the Division I level when the Hawkeyes defeated Minnesota. She garnered win No. 300 at the Division I level with Iowa's regular season finale win over Indiana in 2006. During her third season, she captured career win No. 400 in Iowa's triumph over Iowa State and victory No. 450 when Iowa topped Creighton in the first round of the WNIT.  During the '07–'08 season her Hawkeyes defeated Penn State on February 10 to give Coach Bluder career win No. 500. When Iowa beat Purdue on January 20, 2013 Coach Bluder made that her Career win No. 600.

USA Basketball
Bluder was the head coach of the U.S.A. women's basketball team at the 2015 Pan American Games. The event was held in Toronto, Canada from July 16–20, 2015. Bluder's USA team had a strong roster, including 2015 All-Americans Breanna Stewart, Moriah Jefferson, and Tiffany Mitchell. The USA team secured a 75–69 win over Brazil in its opening game, followed by a lopsided 94–55 win over Dominican Republic in the second round. In its final preliminary round game, the USA outscored Puerto Rico 93–77 to secure a number one seed heading into the medal semifinals. Bluder's team survived a close semi-final game against Cuba with a 65–64 win that advanced the USA into the gold medal game. The USA team led Canada in the championship game by as much as 11 points early on, but a strong third quarter by Canada gave them the lead, and an eventual 81–73 win over the USA women. Bluder and her team returned home from Toronto with a silver medal.

Bluder served as an assistant coach of the USA representative to the 1999 World University Games (also known as the Universiade). The event was held in Palma de Mallorca, Spain. The USA team opened with a 134–37 win over South Africa. The second game was against Canada, which the USA team lost in a close match 68–67. The USA could not afford to lose another game if they wished to win a medal, and won the next game against Japan 106–66. The USA next faced undefeated Russia, and fell behind by twelve points at halftime, but came back and won the game 79–68. The USA fell behind in their next game against undefeated China, but rallied and went on to win 89–78. The USA then beat Brazil to advance to the semi-final, where they faced Lithuania. The game was not close, with the USA winning 70–49. That set up a rematch with China, on their home court with 18,000 spectators. The USA only had a four-point lead at halftime, but did better in the second half, and won 87–69 to claim the gold medal. Ayana Walker set a World University Games record with 19 rebounds in the game. Walker was the leading scorer and rebounder for the USA team with 15.4 points and 8.6 rebounds per game.

Head coaching record
Drake was awarded a forfeit victory over Valparaiso during the 1995–96 season due to Valparaiso's use of an ineligible player. Drake originally lost that game 79–80. Drake recognizes that game as a victory, but the NCAA does not, thus the NCAA statistics database includes a record of 15–4 for that year.

References

1961 births
Living people
American women's basketball coaches
Basketball coaches from Iowa
Basketball players from Iowa
Drake Bulldogs women's basketball coaches
Iowa Hawkeyes women's basketball coaches
Northern Iowa Panthers women's basketball players
People from Marion, Iowa
Linn-Mar High School alumni